Clacker may refer to:

 Clacker, a character in The Dark Elf Trilogy
 a clapperboard, a device used in filmmaking

See also
 Clackers (disambiguation)